The Pompeian–Parthian invasion of 40 BC occurred after the Pompeians, backed by the Parthian Empire, had been defeated during the Liberators' civil war by Mark Antony and Octavian.

King Orodes II sent a Parthian force under Prince Pacorus I and Pompeian General Quintus Labienus in 40 BC to invade the eastern Roman territories while Antony was in Egypt. Roman soldiers in Syria, many of whom had fought against Caesar during the last civil war, joined the force, and the Levant and much of Asia Minor were swiftly overrun by respectively Pacorus I and Labienus.

In 39 BC, Antony sent Ventidius, who defeated and executed Labienus in a counterattack and then drove Pacorus I out of the Levant. A second Parthian invasion of Syria by Pacorus I resulted in his death and a Parthian failure.

Antony later began a campaign with a massive force against Parthia, but it ended in Roman defeat. Roman–Parthian hostilities formally ended only under the reign of Octavian (Augustus).

Background
The Parthians had defeated and killed Marcus Licinius Crassus, a member of the First Triumvirate along with Julius Caesar and Pompey, at the Battle of Carrhae. They had also maintained relations with Pompey but never supported him militarily during Caesar's Civil War. After Pompey's death, Caesar planned an invasion of Parthia but was assassinated before he could implement it. 

In 42 BC, Parthian forces fought against the Caesarians under Mark Antony and Octavian in the Battle of Philippi during the Liberators' civil war. After the defeat of the Liberators, who had assassinated Caesar, Quintus Labienus, a general who attempted to resurrect the Pompeian cause and had been sent to Parthia to ask for assistance in the last civil war, joined the Parthians. King Orodes II sent him and his son Pacorus I to invade eastern Roman territories while Antony was in Egypt with Cleopatra.

Invasion
Orodes II sent his son Pacorus I as well as Labienus as the commanders of a large Parthian army to invade Roman territory in early 40 BC (or late 41 BC, according to some scholars). According to Vagi, the invasion comprised some 20,000 horsemen. Many Roman forces in Syria defected to Labienus. Antony's commander in Syria, Lucius Decidius Saxa, fled to Antioch and then to Cilicia, where he was captured by Labienus and executed. Several Roman aquilae were then captured by the Parthians. (The aquilae, together with ones captured after the Battle of Carrhae, were later returned after Augustus's negotiations with the Parthians.) Apamea and Antioch surrendered.

The two commanders split. Pacorus invaded Palestine and Phoenicia while Labienus launched a "blitzkrieg" in Asia Minor that captured much of the region. He was hailed as imperator. Pacorus I had gained a reputation for military talent and moderation and swiftly took all the cities along the Levantine coast with the exception of Tyre, which was notoriously difficult to capture. He reached Gaza by May 40 BC and received homage from the Nabataeans.

Meanwhile, his general Barzapharnes led a force inland. The pro-Parthian Jewish leader Antigonus II Mattathias sent a large subsidy to Pacorus I, who supported him in the fight against the pro-Roman Jewish leaders Hyrcanus II and Phasael and successfully installed him as the new king of Judea. Hyrcanus II and Phasael were captured trying to negotiate with the Parthians and were deported to Parthia, and Herod, another leader, fled.

Antony left Egypt for Greece and sent Publius Ventidius Bassus to Asia Minor. He scored two victories with minimal forces north of the Taurus Mountains in 39 BC (Battle of the Cilician Gates, Battle of Amanus Pass) and captured and executed Labienus. He then drove the Parthians out of Syria.

Another Parthian invasion of Syria in 38 BC under Pacorus I resulted in a decisive defeat at the Battle of Mount Gindarus in Cyrrhestica, with Pacorus I being killed and the Parthian presence in Syria being brought to an end.

Coins minted by Labienus survive from the period and were probably minted in Antioch. Labienus had designated himself as Parthicus.

Aftermath
In 38 BC, Mark Antony finally began his campaign against Parthia with a large force, but it resulted in a defeat with heavy Roman losses.

References

40 BC
40s BC conflicts
1st century BC in Iran
1st century BC in the Hasmonean Kingdom
1st century BC in the Roman Republic
Wars involving the Parthian Empire
Wars involving the Roman Republic
Roman Anatolia
Roman–Parthian Wars
Roman Syria